Suave Suave is the second album by B-Tribe, released in 1995.

Track listing
Suave Suave 
Que Mala Vida (Album Version) 
Sensual (Based on Jules Massenet's Méditation (Thaïs))
Ahoy 
Hablando 
Interlude (Based on Eric Satie's Gymnopédie #2)
Albatross
Te Siento 
Nanita (A Spanish Lullaby)
Poesia (poem by Antonio Machado) (Based on  Satie's Gymnopédie #2) 
Yo Quiero Todo 
Manha De Carneval (feat José Carreras)
featuring Deborah Blando

1995 albums
B-Tribe albums